Marston on Dove is a civil parish in the South Derbyshire district of Derbyshire, England.  The parish contains three listed buildings that are recorded in the National Heritage List for England.  Of these, one is listed at Grade I, the highest of the three grades, and the others are at Grade II, the lowest grade.  The parish contains the village of Marston on Dove and the surrounding area.  The listed buildings consist of a church, its lychgate, and a small country house.


Key

Buildings

References

Citations

Sources

 

Lists of listed buildings in Derbyshire